The 2014–15 Serie A1 is the 96th season of the Serie A1, Italy's premier Water polo league.

Team information

The following 12 clubs compete in the Serie A1 during the 2014–15 season:

Regular season

Standings

Pld - Played; W - Won; D - Drawn; L - Lost; GF - Goals for; GA - Goals against; Diff - Difference; Pts - Points.

Schedule and results

Championship playoff 
Teams in bold won the playoff series. Numbers to the left of each team indicate the team's original playoff seeding. Numbers to the right indicate the score of each playoff game.

Final
1st leg

2nd leg

3rd leg

Pro Recco N.E PN won Championship final series 3–0.

5th – 8th placement 
Teams in bold won the playoff series. Numbers to the left of each team indicate the team's original playoff seeding. Numbers to the right indicate the score of each playoff game.

Season statistics

Top goalscorers
Updated to games played on 16 May 2015.

Number of teams by regions

Final standing

References

External links
 Italian Water Polo Federaration 

Seasons in Italian water polo competitions
Italy
Serie A1
Serie A1
2014 in water polo
2015 in water polo